Creagen Dow (born May 1, 1991) is an American actor, writer, producer and programmer who had a recurring role as Jeremiah Trottman on the Nickelodeon series Zoey 101. He has also guest-starred on The Big Bang Theory, Rizzoli & Isles, Hannah Montana, Castle, Entourage, Hot in Cleveland, CSI: NY, and other shows. Creagen received a Best Supporting Actor award for his role in the feature film Hamlet's Ghost and also appeared  alongside Reese Witherspoon and Vince Vaughn in Four Christmases, with Sean Astin in Amazing Love and provided the voice of "Mullet Boy" in the film The Ant Bully. Creagen can also be seen in various television commercials, including the GEICO Horror Movie - It's What You Do campaign.

He has developed applications for iOS and Android. In 2012, eight years after moving to Los Angeles for his acting career, Creagen started a cannabis business which sold smoking paraphernalia. Outside of his work in acting, Creagen has developed a line of ash & resin removing ashtrays called Poke A Bowl. Poke A Bowl makes an appearance in the music video to "Mind of a Stoner" by rapper Machine Gun Kelly (featuring Wiz Khalifa), and American actress Kathy Bates used it on the Netflix series Disjointed. It is currently among the most popular ashtrays.

Filmography

Film

Television

See also 
 List of celebrities who own cannabis businesses

References

External links
 

1991 births
Living people
21st-century American male actors
Male actors from Florida
American male child actors
American male film actors
American male television actors
American male voice actors
People from Lake Wales, Florida